Mastenbroek is a polder in the Dutch province of Overijssel. It lies north of the city of Zwolle. "Mastenbroek" is also the name of an hamlet, built around a church in the middle of the polder.

The polder is part of three municipalities: the western part, including the hamlet Bisschopswetering and half of the village of Mastenbroek, lies in Kampen; the southeastern part lies in Zwolle; and the northeastern part, including the hamlet of Nieuwe Wetering and the other half of the village of Mastenbroek, lies in Zwartewaterland. It used to split into six municipalities.

It was first mentioned in 1277 as Mastenbroic. The etymology is unclear. In 1169, it was attested as Vorsterbruc, but that name was reference to the entire wilderness between the IJssel and Zwarte Water. In 1369, a church was built in the hamlet. The current church dates from around 1647. In 1864, the inhabitants petitioned the government to construct a railway station in their hamlet which was initially denied. The stop was built  from the village, and closed in 1933.

Gallery

References 

Populated places in Overijssel
Kampen, Overijssel
Zwartewaterland
Zwolle